Thomas Cook Tourism (UK) Company Limited, known as Thomas Cook UK, is an Anglo-Chinese package holiday provider which offers 'Flight + Hotel' packages and Hotel only bookings. The company was launched in 2019, when Chinese firm Fosun International purchased the brand from the insolvent Thomas Cook Group, and began trading in September 2020.

History

2019
Before the formation of the new company, its owner Fosun International held a 7% stake in the British insolvent Thomas Cook Group.

In August 2019, Fosun negotiated a rescue package for the failing group, which had lost £1.5bn in that year. The package consisted of a £900m bailout, in which Fosun would pay in £450m and the other £450m paid by banks and bondholders; the deal would mean that Fosun would hold a stake of 75% in the Thomas Cook Group Tour Operator and 25% in Thomas Cook Group Airlines. The rescue package fell through in September when investors demanded an extra £200m to ensure the group survived through winter.

On the morning of 23 September 2019, Thomas Cook Group entered compulsory liquidation and all operations ceased.

On 1 November 2019, it was announced that Fosun had acquired the Thomas Cook brand and numerous hotels for £11m.

The new company was set to commence operations in 2020, as Fosun began hiring former Thomas Cook executives to begin relaunch preparations in late 2019.

2020
The Thomas Cook website changed from its 'compulsory liquidation’ page to a new Thomas Cook Tourism page.

In September 2020, Fosun announced it was awaiting the necessary regulatory approval from ATOL, with plans of an official Thomas Cook relaunch as early as September. Plans do not include a relaunch of Thomas Cook Airlines, or the high street estate.

The Thomas Cook UK site was launched on 16 September after the company received their ATOL and ABTA certification.

The holiday company began offering holidays but only when flights were permitted to fly from the UK due to the COVID-19 pandemic – This followed with the CEO Alan French announcing that all holidays offered would be quarantine free (within the United Kingdom's travel corridor).

Due to controversy on Thomas Cook's position regarding refunds on holidays cancelled by the UK Government, management announced on 30 September that in the case that a holiday is cancelled refunds will be issued to customers within 14-days.

On 25 October, the Canary Islands were added to the United Kingdom travel corridor, and Thomas Cook began selling these on 23 October.

On 16 December Thomas Cook launched long-haul 'Flight + Hotel' bookings to quarantine free destinations including Dubai and Punta Cana. It was also announced that New York City, Las Vegas and Orlando would be offered from 1 May 2021 as British citizens could not travel to the United States due to COVID-19 regulations.

2021
In the beginning of January the Prime Minister Boris Johnson placed England into national lockdown. This meant that Thomas Cook and other UK tour operators were forced to cancel all holidays departing England until mid-February. Holidays with flights departing from Scotland and Wales would be cancelled until the end of January. By March 2021, bookings had been resumed again.

References

British companies established in 2019
British subsidiaries of foreign companies
Companies based in the City of London
Fosun International
Online travel agencies
Re-established companies
Tourism agencies
Transport companies established in 2019
Travel and holiday companies of the United Kingdom